Pourtalesia is a genus of the family Pourtalesiidae which belongs to the irregular (bilaterally symmetrical) sea urchins. The animals measure 5–6 cm in length and live in the abyssal zone of the Atlantic, Pacific, Indopacific and Antarctic Oceans where they have been found in more than 3,000 m depth. The mouth opening of these animals is located anteriorly and the lantern of Aristotle is missing as typically for holasteroid sea urchins.

Species 
Currently, 11 species of Pourtalesia are recognized.

 Pourtalesia alcocki Koehler, 1914 
 Pourtalesia aurorae Koehler, 1926
 Pourtalesia debilis Koehler, 1926
 Pourtalesia heptneri Mironov, 1978
 Pourtalesia hispida A. Agassiz, 1897
 Pourtalesia jeffreysi Thomson, 1873
 Pourtalesia laguncula A. Agassiz, 1879
 Pourtalesia miranda A. Agassiz, 1869
 Pourtalesia tanneri A. Agassiz, 1898
 Pourtalesia thomsoni Mironov, 1976
 Pourtalesia vinogradovae Mironov, 1995

References 

Holasteroida